Arjan Drayton Chana (born 2 March 1994) is an English U-21 international field hockey player, who plays as a forward for England and Great Britain U-21's.

 
He plays club hockey in the Men's England Hockey League Premier Division for Surbiton.

Drayton Chana previously played for Cannock.

He was educated at Repton School and has represented England at U-16, U-18 and U-21 levels. He made his GB U-21 debut v Australia, in Sydney in January 2013.

References

1994 births
Living people
English male field hockey players
Surbiton Hockey Club players
Cannock Hockey Club players
People educated at Repton School
Men's England Hockey League players